Sir William Williams, 6th Baronet (– 23 December 1696) of Faenol (Vaynol) was a Welsh politician and landowner elected as MP for Caernarvonshire from 1689 until his death.

Career
Williams was born in around 1663, the son of Sir Griffith Williams (d.), 4th Baronet, of Faenol (Vaynol), and his wife Penelope, daughter of Thomas, 1st Viscount Bulkeley. Sir Griffith was one of the Williams baronets, and was succeeded by his son Sir Thomas Williams (d.) as 5th Baronet. Sir William succeeded his brother in around 1673.

In 1688, he succeeded Robert, 2nd Viscount Bulkeley as Vice-Admiral of North Wales and, in the following year, he was elected as MP for Caernarvonshire. He married his cousin Ellen Bulkeley, the daughter of Robert, 2nd Viscount Bulkeley.

Death and legacy
Williams died on 23 December 1696 and the Baronetcy became extinct. Ignoring the claims of an impostor, Arthur Owen, who claimed to be a relative, Williams left his Vaynol estate to the descendants of his friend, the late Sir Bourchier Wrey, 4th Baronet.

Arms

References

Bibliography 
Sir William Williams, 6th Baronet, History of Parliament Online

Year of birth uncertain
1660s births
1696 deaths
Baronets in the Baronetage of England
Members of the Parliament of England (pre-1707) for constituencies in Wales
English MPs 1689–1690
English MPs 1690–1695
English MPs 1695–1698